Alexander Lockwood  (May 5, 1902 – January 25, 1990) was an American actor. He appeared in numerous films and television shows throughout the 1930s to the 1980s.

Biography
Lockwood was born in  Slezská Ostrava, now Czech Republic, in 1902. Lockwood began his acting career in film in 1938, appearing in films like Just Off Broadway, Sherlock Holmes in Washington and Jigsaw during the 1940s. During the 1950s and 1960s he appeared in films like The Wrong Man and The Invisible Boy with Richard Eyer. He also appeared in The Story of Mankind and Monster on the Campus. He also acted in films like The Tarnished Angels and Edge of Eternitywith Cornel Wilde and Cary Grant during the late 1950s. During the 1960s he appeared in films like Beauty and the Beast with Joyce Taylor and Walk on the Wild Side with Laurence Harvey and The Monkey's Uncle with Tommy Kirk during the 1960s. During the 1970s he appeared in films like Duel, Family Plot and Close Encounters of the Third Kind. Lockwood last acted in the film Romantic Comedy in 1983.

Death
Lockwood died in 1990 at the age of 87.

Selected filmography

Film

 Angels with Dirty Faces (1938) - Reporter (uncredited)
 Wings of the Navy (1939) - Jerry's Flight Instructor (uncredited)
 Murder in the Air (1940) - Dirigible Officer (uncredited)
 Flight from Destiny (1941) - Conway
 Dive Bomber (1941) - Squadron Commander (uncredited)
 Dick Tracy vs. Crime, Inc. (1941) - Smith (uncredited)
 The Bugle Sounds (1942) - Sergeant (uncredited)
 Mississippi Gambler (1942) - Spence 
 Saboteur (1942) - Marine (uncredited)
 Just Off Broadway (1942) - Edmond Telmachio
 Madame Spy (1942) - Cab Driver (uncredited)
 Sherlock Holmes in Washington (1943) - Reporter (uncredited)
 Jigsaw (1949) - Nichols
 With These Hands (1950) - Doctor (in 1913) (uncredited)
 The Tattered Dress (1957) - Paul Vernon
 The Invisible Boy (1957) - Arthur Kelvaney
 Hell Canyon Outlaws (1957) - Bert - the New Sheriff
 The Story of Mankind (1957) - Promoter
 The Tarnished Angels (1957) - Sam Hagood
 Run Silent, Run Deep (1958) - Minor Role (uncredited)
 Too Much, Too Soon (1958) - Alfred (uncredited)
 King Creole (1958) - Dr. Patrick (uncredited)
 Monster on the Campus (1958) - Prof. Gilbert Howard
 This Earth Is Mine (1959) - Dr. Regis (uncredited)
 North by Northwest (1959) - Judge Anson B. Flynn (uncredited)
 Edge of Eternity (1959) - Jim Kendon
 Walk on the Wild Side (1962) - Doctor in Teresina's Café (uncredited)
 13 West Street (1962) - Schaffer (uncredited)
 Beauty and the Beast (1962) - Man
 The Monkey's Uncle (1965) - Regent
 The Ballad of Josie (1967) - Parson (uncredited)
 Duel (1971) - Old Man in Car
 The Sting (1973) - Landlord (uncredited)
 Family Plot (1976) - Parson
 Close Encounters of the Third Kind (1977) - Implantee #2
 Wholly Moses! (1980) - Elderly Man
 Making Love (1982) - Minister
 Romantic Comedy (1983) - The Minister

Television

 Tales of Tomorrow (1952) - Dr. Gorham
 Telephone Time (1956) - Councilman Martin
 The Ford Television Theatre (1957) - District Attorney
 Sheriff of Cochise (1957) - Inspector Boland
 The Silent Service (1957) - War Corresondent Howard
 Zane Grey Theater (1958) - Lacey
 Startime (1960) - Principal Rigsby
 The Law and Mr. Jones (1961)
 My Three Sons (1961) – "Dean" Talbot
 Window on Main Street (1961) – episode "The Big Spender" – Ethan Carter 
 It's a Man's World (1962) - Will Ryder
 Mr. Novak (1965) - Collins
 Profiles in Courage (1965) - Congressman Mills
 The Cavanaughs (1988) - Leo Lafferty (final television appearance)

References

External links
 
 

1902 births
1990 deaths
20th-century American male actors
American male film actors
American male television actors
Czech male film actors
Czechoslovak emigrants to the United States
People with acquired American citizenship